The following is a list of awards and nominations received by actor Andrew Garfield.

Major associations

Academy Awards

BAFTA Awards

Golden Globe Awards

Laurence Olivier Awards

Primetime Emmy Awards

Screen Actors Guild Awards

Tony Awards

Festivals & Guilds

Capri Hollywood International Film Festival

Hollywood Film Festival

Palm Springs International Film Festival

Santa Barbara International Film Festival

Zurich Film Festival

Other awards

Film awards

AACTA Awards

Awards Circuit Community Awards

AFCA Film & Writing Awards

British Independent Film Awards

Critics' Choice Super Awards

Evening Standard British Film Awards

The Film Art Awards

Gold Derby Awards

Golden Schmoes Awards

IGN Summer Movie Awards

National Movie Awards

International Cinephile Society Awards

International Online Cinema Awards

Irish Film and Television Award

Italian Online Movie Awards

MTV Movie & TV Awards

Nickelodeon Kids' Choice Awards

Online Film & Television Association

People's Choice Awards

Satellite Awards

Saturn Awards

Scream Awards

Teen Choice Awards

Young Hollywood Awards

Theatre awards

Broadway.com Audience Choice Awards

Drama Desk Awards

Drama League Awards
The recipient can only receive the award once during his or her career.

Evening Standard Theatre Awards

Outer Critics Circle Awards

Theatregoers' Choice Awards

Theatre Fans' Choice Awards

WhatsOnStage Awards

Television awards

Satellite Awards

CinEuphoria Awards

Royal Television Society

Critics associations

Notes

References

Garfield, Andrew
Garfield, Andrew